Penuche (from ) is a fudge-like candy made from brown sugar, butter, and milk, using no flavorings except for vanilla. Penuche often has a tannish color, and is lighter than regular fudge. It is formed by the caramelization of brown sugar; thus, its flavor is said to be reminiscent of caramel. Nuts, especially pecans, are often added to penuche for texture, frequently in the making of penuche candies. It is primarily a regional food, found in New England and some places in the Southern United States, though in the latter it goes by different names, including creamy praline fudge, and brown sugar fudge candy.

Origins
Panocha is said to come from the Spanish word for 'raw sugar'. It was also long rumored to be slightly dirty or naughty in nature in Portuguese as slang. Penuche is thought to have origins in Portugal and was made popular in New England among Portuguese whaling families in New Bedford, MA, and Essex, CT, during the whaling period of the mid to late 1700s through the end of commercial whaling. Penuche is also used as a boiled icing flavor. In Hawaii, its name is localized as panocha or panuche. As an icing, it was common as topping for prune cake.

Recipes
Penuche is classed in the fudge family because it follows a similar method of preparation:
Flavorings are added and the solution is beaten until thick.
The mixture is poured into a pan, allowed to cool, and cut into bite-sized pieces.
Most traditional (i.e. not "no-cook" or "quick") fudges follow a similar preparation method. What distinguishes penuche is the use of brown sugar rather than white.

In recent years, it has become common in New England to add maple syrup to the recipe for penuche fudge. Some confectioners will call this "maple syrup penuche fudge", and others do not make any distinction at all.

One penuche-style recipe is called "no-bake penuche drop cookies", which is made from brown sugar, milk, butter, oats, and nuts.

A very similar confection is Sucre à la Crème (cream sugar), a Québec confection traditionally prepared during the winter holiday season.  The universality of the brown sugar and dairy confection manifests in the form of a slightly crumblier treat called Tablet originating in Scotland.

See also
 Reese's pieces

References

America's Cook Book, Compiled by the New York Herald Tribune home institute, published by Charles Scribner's Sons. Copyright 1937, 1940, 1942.

Confectionery
New England cuisine